Amata decorata  is a species of moth of the family Erebidae first described by Francis Walker in 1862. It is found on Borneo. The habitat consists of lowland areas.

Adults are day-flying.

References 

Moths described in 1862
decorata
Moths of Asia